Bhagirathi is a 2012 Indian Kannada drama film written and directed by Baraguru Ramachandrappa. The film as Bhavana and Kishore in the lead role with Srinath, Tara, Hema Choudhury and Padma Vasanthi in the supporting role. The film is based on a folktale from North Karnataka, "Kerege Haara", which glorifies the sacrifice of a young woman for the sake of her village and her heart-broken husband.

Plot 
Bhagirathi (Bhavana) dreams of a tank for her village and inspired by her, Maadevaraya (Kishore), the son of Mallanagowda (Srinath), convinces his father to construct one for the community. When Maadevaraya and Bhagirathi fall in love, class differences come in the way. But when they decide to end their lives, Mallanagowda is moved to solemnise their marriage on the tank's site.

As fate would have it, the tank remains dry and the priest advises Mallanagowda to sacrifice of one of his daughters-in-law. The lot falls on Bhagirathi. On learning what has happened to his young wife, Maadevaraya ends his life in the tank.

Cast 
 Bhavana as Bhagirathi
 Kishore as Mahadevaraya
 Srinath as Mallanagowda
 Tara
 Hema Choudhury
 Padma Vasanthi
 Shivadhwaj
 Ravishankar
 Vatsala Mohan

Soundtrack 

The soundtrack album of the film was released on 20 November 2011 by actor Puneeth Rajkumar in Bangalore.
 The album consists of six tracks, lyrics for which were written by Baraguru Ramachandrappa for music composed by V. Manohar, who also scored the film's background music.

Review 

IBN Live reviewed the movie and said, "Bhagirathi' is a one time watch". The Hindu review the movie and said "Bhagirathi - Bringing alive a Kannada folktale".

The movie completed 100 days of show.

Awards 
 Karnataka State Film Award for Best Actress - Bhavana
 Karnataka State Film Award for Best Lyricist - Baraguru Ramachandrappa
 Karnataka State Film Award for Best Female Playback Singer - Archana Udupa
 Udaya Film Awards for Best Supporting Actress - Tara

References 

2012 films
Films scored by V. Manohar
2010s Kannada-language films